Chlorotherion consimilis is a species of beetle in the family Cerambycidae. It was described by Dmytro Zajciw in 1962. It is endemic to Brazil and known from São Paulo, Espírito Santo, and Mato Grosso.

References

Trachyderini
Beetles of South America
Insects of Brazil
Endemic fauna of Brazil
Beetles described in 1962